Blastobasis achaea is a moth in the  family Blastobasidae. It is found in Costa Rica.

The length of the forewings is 5.9 mm. The forewings are pale brown intermixed with brown scales tipped with pale brown and dark-brown scales. The hindwings are translucent pale brown.

Etymology
The specific epithet is derived from the Roman province of Achaea, which included the whole of Greece, except Thessaly.

References

Moths described in 2013
Blastobasis
Moths of Central America